Sviatoslav or Svyatoslav Igorevich may refer to:

 Sviatoslav I of Kiev (942?- 972)
 Svyatoslav III Igorevich (1176 – 1211), Rus' prince